Periódico ABC is a daily newspaper printed and distributed in Monterrey, Nuevo León, Mexico founded in 1985. As of 2003, its daily circulation was 40,000 and its Sunday circulation was 45,000.

In 2015, it won an award for its redesign from the Society of News Design.

External links

 ABCnoticias.mx

References 

Mass media in Monterrey
Newspapers published in Mexico
Spanish-language newspapers